Li Yang (born 22 July 1997) is a Chinese footballer currently playing as a midfielder for Guangzhou.

Club career
Li Yang would represent Jiangsu in the 2015 China National Youth Games, where they came runners-up at the end of the tournament. He would go abroad to Portugal to continue his development where he played for Gondomar and then Coimbrões. At Coimbrões he would be promoted to their senior team where he made his debut on 21 January 2018 in a Campeonato de Portugal league game against Canelas 2010, coming on as a substitute in a 3-2 victory. This would be followed by a transfer to Primeira Liga club Vitória who loaned him out to Chinese Super League club Shanghai Shenhua on 8 July 2019, however his return to China only saw him play a single game against Tianjin TEDA F.C. in the Chinese FA Cup that ended in a 3-1 victory.

Career statistics

Notes

References

External links

1997 births
Living people
Chinese footballers
Chinese expatriate footballers
China youth international footballers
Association football defenders
Gondomar S.C. players
Vitória S.C. players
Shanghai Shenhua F.C. players
Wuhan F.C. players
Guangzhou F.C. players
Chinese Super League players
Chinese expatriate sportspeople in Portugal
Expatriate footballers in Portugal